Porcellionides approximatus is a woodlouse that is endemic to Crimea, Ukraine.

References

Porcellionidae
Crustaceans described in 1885
Endemic fauna of Crimea
Woodlice of Europe